Crowe Hall is a Georgian house in Widcombe, Bath, Somerset, England. It is a Grade II listed building, and the gardens are on the Register of Historic Parks and Gardens of special historic interest in England.

The house was built around 1760 for a Brigadier Crowe. It has since had a succession of owners who each adapted and renovated the building and grounds. A serious fire in 1926 destroyed much of the fabric and further restoration was required.

The house is surrounded by several hectares of sloping terraced gardens, below Prior Park, which include a rock garden and grotto.

History

The fabric of the current house dates from around 1760 on the site of an earlier building of 1742. A late 18th century sketch by Thomas Robins which is held at the Courtauld Institute of Art shows the house surrounded by informal parkland, in the style of the period.  The front of the house was rebuilt in the early 19th century.

The house was built by Brigadier Crowe. From 1805 until 1919 it was owned by the Tugwell family. George Hayward Tugwell, the mayor of Bath, reconstructed the house and laid out the basic framework for a formal terraced garden in around 1810. During the 1870s the house was again remodelled, this time by Henry Tugwell.  In 1874, Henry Tugwell appointed William Carmichael (c 1816-1904) as head gardener and he undertook a series oalterations to the gardens.  Carmichael was trained at the Edinburgh Botanic Gardens, and had been head gardener at Sandringham House, Norfolk in the 1860s. In 1919 the Tugwell family sold the house and it was purchased by Major Maconochie who made profit from supplying tinned food as food rations for British soldiers in the field during the Boer War and in front-line trenches during World War I.  It changed hands several times afterwards, before being purchased by Sir Sydney Barratt in 1960, who further developed the garden.  In 2010 the house was sold at auction by the Barratt family, with the contents including furniture, books and glassware being auctioned separately.

In 2019 Crowe Hall was used as a filming location for the 2020 ITV police detective series MacDonald and Dodds.

Architecture

The two-storey building, with a basement, has hipped roofs and a porte-cochère. The entrance has four ionic columns.

The west end of the house is an orangery built in the 1880s.

The former coach house is a single-story building with a central elliptical oculus above a pair of arched openings.

The interior was restructured after a major fire in 1926, which completely destroyed the conservatory and much of the back of the house. The work by the architect A. Blomfield Jackson maintained the neo-Georgian appearance.

Gardens

The gardens are Grade II registered on the Register of Historic Parks and Gardens of special historic interest in England.

The rock garden to the east of the front of the house was laid out in the 19th century by William Carmichael. A statue of Neptune was added later. The Tugwells planted Yew trees and laid out paths as well as constructing large retaining walls. Below the south terrace is a tufa and limestone built grotto which may date from the building of Prior Park in 1742.

References

Grade II listed buildings in Bath, Somerset
Buildings and structures in Bath, Somerset
History of Bath, Somerset
Gardens in Somerset
Country houses in Somerset